Fire to Fire is the twenty-second studio album by American country music singer Tanya Tucker, released on March 21, 1995. It produced the singles "Between the Two of Them" and "Find Out What's Happenin'", both of which charted on the Hot Country Songs charts, at #27 and #40 respectively. "I'll Take Today" was later recorded by Ty England on his 1996 album Two Ways to Fall, and in 1998 by Gary Allan on his album It Would Be You; Allan's rendition was released as a single in 1998.  The song "Nobody Dies from a Broken Heart" was also covered by country singer Reba McEntire for her 2000 release, So Good Together. "Find Out What's Happenin'" was originally recorded by Bobby Bare in 1968, Barbara Fairchild in 1970, and Pearl River on their 1993 debut album of the same name. "I'll Take the Memories" was originally recorded by Lorrie Morgan on her 1989 album, Leave the Light On.

Track listing

Personnel
Tanya Tucker - vocals
Paul Leim - drums
David Hungate, Michael Rhodes, Willie Weeks - bass guitar
Mitch Humphries, John Barlow Jarvis, Steve Nathan, Matt Rollings - keyboards
Mike Lawler - synthesizer
Steve Gibson, Dann Huff, Chris Leuzinger, Brent Rowan, Billy Joe Walker Jr., Reggie Young - guitar
Dan Dugmore, Paul Franklin, Sonny Garrish - steel guitar
Rob Hajacos - fiddle
Christy Cornelius, Gregory Gordon, Sharon Rice, Judy Rodman, Sunny Russ, Randy Sharp, Curtis Young - backing vocals
Nashville String Machine - strings; led by Carl Gorodetzky
Bergen White - string arrangements

Production
Produced By Jerry Crutchfield
Engineers: Tim Kish, Warren Peterson, Marty Williams
Assistant Engineers: Derek Bason (also mix assistant), Ricky Cobble, Grant Greene, Joe Hayden, Mark Ralston, King Williams
Mixing: John Guess
Mastering: Glenn Meadows

Chart performance

References

External links
[ Tanya Tucker's "Fire To Fire" at allmusic]

1995 albums
Liberty Records albums
Tanya Tucker albums
Albums produced by Jerry Crutchfield